Thomas Orr Leith OBE, FRAE (23 March 1926 – 7 November 2005) was a leading Scottish mechanical engineer and industrialist.

Biography

Thomas Orr Leith was born on 23 March 1926 in Cathcart, Glasgow, Scotland, youngest son in a family with seven brothers and sisters.

He attended Holmlea Primary School in Cathcart (now closed) before being evacuated to Troon in 1939 at the start of the World War II. In 1942 he returned to Glasgow to join Weir Pumps Ltd in Cathcart, Glasgow (then called G. and J. Weir Ltd)  as an Apprentice Marine Engineer. While an apprentice he also studied for the Higher National Certificate exams at Langside College in Mount Florida and, following this, left Weirs to study full-time at the Royal Technical College, Glasgow (now the University of Strathclyde).  He graduated with a BSc in Mechanical Engineering in 1950, and was winner of the Montgomerie Neilson Gold Medal and Prize (awarded to the first ranked graduating student in Mechanical Engineering).

He rejoined Weir Pumps and in 1954 he became Head of Steam Turbine and Gearing Design, in 1962 was made Chief Designer and in 1966 Director and General Manager of the Pump and Turbine Division (later renamed the Energy Division).  In 1980 he became Director, Contracts Division at Weir Pumps before moving in 1988 to take up the Managing Director role at Weir Westgarth Ltd until his retirement in 1991.  He was Chairman of Clairmont Plc from 1992 to 1994.

He was an inventor or co-inventor of a number of improvements to centrifugal pumps

 and level control, during the period 1956 to 1962 at G. and J. Weir Ltd.

He was a Fellow of the Royal Academy of Engineering, President of the Institution of Engineers and Shipbuilders in Scotland from 1987 to 1989, Fellow of the Institution of Mechanical Engineers and Fellow of the Institution of Marine Engineers. He was conferred Honorary Fellowship of the Institution of Engineers and Shipbuilders in Scotland in 2004.

Thomas Leith was made an Officer of the Order of the British Empire OBE in the 1988 New Year's Honours for Services to Export.

Thomas Leith was active in the local community.  He was Chairman of the Community Council in Newton Mearns and, following a move to Strathaven in Lanarkshire on his retirement in 1991,  was actively involved in the Avondale Civic Society of which he was chairman from 1998 to 2004.  A plaque near Strathaven Castle was raised by Avondale Civic Society to commemorate his contribution.

Selected papers

References

External links 
 Thomas Leith Engineer who bridged gap between experience and modernism, Obituary, The Herald, 7 November 2005
 Weir Westgarth Ltd
 Weir Pumps Ltd

1926 births
Officers of the Order of the British Empire
Presidents of the Institution of Engineers and Shipbuilders in Scotland
Fellows of the Royal Academy of Engineering
Scottish mechanical engineers
20th-century Scottish inventors
Engineers from Glasgow
2005 deaths
Alumni of the University of Strathclyde
Scottish industrial designers
20th-century Scottish businesspeople